Thanasis Tegousis (born 13 December 1986) is a Greek footballer who plays for A.E. Kifisia F.C. in the Football League 2 (Greece) as a winger.

Career
Born in Agrinio, Tegousis began his professional career with local side Panetolikos F.C. in July 2004.

References

External links
 
 Myplayer.gr Profile
 onsports.gr at Onsports.gr

1986 births
Living people
Footballers from Agrinio
Greek footballers
Association football midfielders
Panetolikos F.C. players
Panachaiki F.C. players
Kallithea F.C. players
Egaleo F.C. players